Neville Stephen J. D'Souza (3 August 1932 – 16 March 1980) was an Indian footballer who played as a striker. During the "golden era of Indian football" under legendary coach Syed Abdul Rahim, he was recognised one of the finest strikers of India national team having perfect eye for goal. He finished the 1956 Summer Olympics as joint top scorer with four goals, inducing a hat-trick.

Playing career

Club career
In 1958, D'Souza joined Hardwood League side Caltex SC. In the Bombay-based club, he played alongside noted Goan footballer Catao Fernandes. The club had honor of becoming the first local team in 1958 to win Rovers Cup, one of the oldest football tournament in the world, in which he was part of the team led by Anthony. In that final, they defeated renowned Mohammedan Sporting 3–2.

Beside Caltex, D'Souza also appeared with both Tata and Goan Sports Club.

International career
D'Souza played club football for Bombay. In the 1953 Quadrangular Tournament in Rangoon, he scored the winner for India against arch-rival Pakistan. They also won the tournament in 1954 and 1955.

He represented his nation at the 1956 Summer Olympics in Melbourne, and reached the semi-finals, before going down 1–4 to Yugoslavia, which is still considered India's greatest ever achievement in football. Under the coaching of Syed Abdul Rahim, D'Souza played alongside J. Krishnaswamy, Samar Banerjee, P. K. Banerjee, and achieved fame worldwide. He became the first Asian player to score a hat-trick in an Olympic Games. D'Souza finished the tournament as joint top-scorer, with 4 goals in 3 games, including a hat-trick in a 4–2 win against Australia. Between 1956 and 1962, D'Souza scored eleven goals for India.

Personal life
D'Souza was born in Assagao, Goa on 1 January 1936. He moved to Bombay (now known as Mumbai) for his studies.
D'Souza married Lyra and they have a son named Nigel and two daughters Liesel and Fleurel. D'Souza died of a brain haemorrhage on 16 March 1980.

Legacy

The Mumbai Football Association began organizing U-17 Neville D'Souza Trophy for teenagers from seventeen districts in Maharashtra, which is named after him.

In 2018, Neville D'souza Football Turf was installed within the sports complex in Bandra, which is named after him, and it was inaugurated by Aaditya Thackeray, then chairman of the Mumbai District Football Association (MDFA).

Honours

India
 Colombo Cup: 1953, 1954, 1955

Caltex
Rovers Cup: 1958

Bombay
 Santosh Trophy runner-up: 1958–59

Individual
Summer Olympics top scorer: 1956

See also
 History of Indian football
 History of the India national football team
 India national football team at the Olympics
 List of India national football team hat-tricks

References

Bibliography

External links

 
 Sports Reference profile

1932 births
1980 deaths
Footballers from Mumbai
Indian footballers
Indian Roman Catholics
India international footballers
Olympic footballers of India
Footballers at the 1956 Summer Olympics
Association football forwards
Footballers at the 1954 Asian Games
Asian Games competitors for India
Maharashtra football team players
Mumbai Football League players